The Bucium Monastery, dedicated to "The Sunday of all Aton Saints", is a Romanian Orthodox monastery, located at 14 Păun Street, in the Bucium Hill neighborhood of Iași, Romania.

References

External links
 Churches and monasteries in Iași at Iași City Hall website

Romanian Orthodox churches in Iași
Romanian Orthodox monasteries of Iași County
19th-century Christian monasteries
19th-century churches in Romania
Churches completed in 1853